Elmar Klos (26 January 1910 – 19 July 1993) was a Czech film director who collaborated for 17 years with his Slovak colleague Ján Kadár and with him won the 1965 Oscar for Best Foreign Language Film for the film The Shop on Main Street.

They directed the 1963 film Death Is Called Engelchen, which entered into the 3rd Moscow International Film Festival and won a Golden Prize.

Filmography

References

1910 births
1993 deaths
Czech film directors
Czechoslovak film directors
Directors of Best Foreign Language Film Academy Award winners
Film people from Brno
Burials at Vyšehrad Cemetery